Miguel José Yacamán (born 1946 in Córdoba, Veracruz) is a Mexican physicist who has made contributions to the fields of materials science, nanotechnology, and physics.

His research has focused on the correlation of structure and properties in nanomaterials and he has developed electron microscopy methods to study nanoparticles and 2-D materials. The present focuses of his work are to develop the nanoscale equivalent of high entropy alloys and new catalysts to produce cleaner fuels.

He earned his Ph.D. in Physics in 1972 from the National Autonomous University of Mexico and did his postdoctoral materials science studies at the University of Oxford. He was also a Postdoctoral Fellow at the NASA Ames Research Center in Mountain View, California from 1978-1979.

Yacamán became the director of the Institute of Physics from 1983-1991.  He was the Reese Endowed Professor in Engineering at the University of Texas at Austin from 2001-2008. In 2008, he joined The University of Texas at San Antonio (UTSA) to chair the Department of Physics and Astronomy in the College of Sciences until 2018.

As of 2019, he is a professor of physics at Northern Arizona University.

Research
Yacamán has done research on the structure and properties of nanoparticles including metals, semiconductors, and magnetic materials. He has worked on synthesis and characterization of new materials (mainly nanoparticles), surfaces and interfaces, defects in solids, electron diffraction and imaging theory, quasicrystals, archaeological materials, catalysis, and physics and chemistry of asphaltenes.

Yacamán is the author of 9 books and over 550 technical papers with over 32,000 total citations. His work in nanoparticles opened a new era in electron microscopy of finite size. He has acted as associate editor of journals such as Acta and Scripta Metallurgica, Catalysis Letters, Journal of Nanostructured Materials, Microscopy Research, and Techniques and Materials Chemistry.

In June 2005, in collaboration with Jose Luis Elechiguerra (Fulbright Fellow), he published a groundbreaking paper on the inhibitory properties of silver nanoparticles against HIV-1. (Journal of Nanobiotechnology)

Honors and distinctions
Yacamán has held the Guggenheim Fellowship, and was awarded numerous prizes such as the National Prize of Sciences of Mexico and the Prize of the National Academy of Mexico in Exact Sciences. He is a member of the Mexican National Research System (level III), and in May 2003 he was appointed National Researcher of Excellence by CONACyT.

Yacamán has also made many contributions to Mexican science as Science Director of CONACyT (National Council of Science and Technology) during the nineties establishing many new programs that changed Mexican science.

Doctorate honoris causa Universidad Nacional de Córdoba (2012) 
Distinguished Scientist SACNAS (2012) 
John Wheatley Award of the American Physical Society (2011)
Doctorate honoris causa Universidad Autonoma de Nuevo León (2010) 
Investigador Nacional de Excelencia CONACyT (2002)
Robert Franklin Melh Award and Distinguish lecture, The Metals and Materials Society USA (1997)
National Prize of Sciences in Mexico (1992)
Prize in Exact Sciences of the State of Mexico (1987)
National Prize in Exact Sciences of the Mexican Academy of Sciences (1982)

References

External links
Complete list of publications of Miguel José Yacamán
Appointment at UTSA press release
M. José Yacamán speaks of 'The bactericidal effect of silver nanoparticles'
Interview with Dr. Miguel Jose-Yacaman
Asociación de Empresarios Mexicanos interview
Miguel Jose Yacaman receives John Wheatley Award 2011
SACNAS Honors Six Leaders in Science Research, Mentoring, Teaching
Scopus Award Mexico
2011 John Wheatley Award
Miguel José Yacamán recibió el título de Doctor Honoris Causa de la UNC, Spanish
Physics Researcher Miguel Yacaman Receives Honorary Doctorate from Mexican University
Mexico's Flagship University Gets a New Leader

1946 births
Living people
People from Córdoba, Veracruz
Mexican people of Lebanese descent
20th-century Mexican physicists
Nanotechnologists